Bomai/Gumai Rural LLG (also spelled Bomai/Kumai Rural LLG) is a local-level government (LLG) of Chimbu Province, Papua New Guinea.

Wards
01. Era 1
02. Era 2
03. Era/Buli
04. Omdara
05. Kua
06. Dia
07. Kopan
08. Yuri
09. Deliku
10. Ainaku
11. Kawaleku
12. Nebiku

References

Local-level governments of Chimbu Province